Al-Shamrani is an Arabic surname that is given to those who are a part of the Arabic tribe known as “Shamran” that exists in the southern part of modern-day Saudi Arabia.

Notable people with the surname include:

 Nasser Al-Shamrani, Saudi footballer
 Rashid Al Shamrani, Saudi actor

References

Arabic-language surnames